The Defence Liaison Two (DL2) Division was a post World War II intelligence unit of Canada's Department of External Affairs (DEA). 

As part of a re-organization plan under Under-Secretary of State for External Affairs Arnold Heeney, the DEA created a Defence Liaison Division in November 1948, to address military aspects of foreign policy and work with the Department of National Defence. In 1950, the division was split, with security and intelligence matters falling to a new DL(2) division.

References

History of Canada (1945–1960)